The Malta men's national under-20 basketball team is a national basketball team of Malta, administered by the Malta Basketball Association. It represents the country in men's international under-20 basketball competitions.

FIBA U20 European Championship participations

See also
Malta men's national basketball team
Malta men's national under-18 basketball team

References

External links
Archived records of Malta team participations

Basketball in Malta
Basketball
Men's national under-20 basketball teams